Abdullah Elyasa Süme (born 13 August 1983) is a retired Turkish footballer. He most recently worked as the sporting director of Gaziantepspor.

References

External links
 
 Guardian Stats Centre

1983 births
Living people
Turkish footballers
Turkey under-21 international footballers
German footballers
KFC Uerdingen 05 players
Samsunspor footballers
Diyarbakırspor footballers
MKE Ankaragücü footballers
Gaziantepspor footballers
Kasımpaşa S.K. footballers
Süper Lig players
German people of Turkish descent
Association football defenders
People from Wesel
Sportspeople from Düsseldorf (region)
Footballers from North Rhine-Westphalia